Aleksandr Vladimirovich Lomakin (born 14 February 1995) is a Russian football player. He plays for FC Yenisey Krasnoyarsk.

Club career
He made his debut in the Russian Football National League for FC Yenisey Krasnoyarsk on 20 September 2014 in a game against FC Gazovik Orenburg. He made his Russian Premier League debut for FC Ural Yekaterinburg on 25 April 2017 in a game against FC Spartak Moscow. On 19 June 2019, he joined FC Yenisey Krasnoyarsk for the third time on loan until the end of the 2019–20 season. On 4 July 2020 he moved to Yenisey on a permanent basis, signing a 2-year contract.

Personal life
On 3 December 2018, his younger brother Aleksei Lomakin, a member of the Under-21 squad for FC Lokomotiv Moscow, was found dead in Moscow at the age of 18.

References

External links
 Profile by Russian Football National League

1995 births
Footballers from Moscow
Living people
Russian footballers
Russia youth international footballers
Association football midfielders
FC Lokomotiv Moscow players
FC Yenisey Krasnoyarsk players
U.D. Leiria players
FC Ural Yekaterinburg players
FC Fakel Voronezh players
Russian Premier League players
Russian First League players
Campeonato de Portugal (league) players
Russian expatriate footballers
Expatriate footballers in Portugal
Russian expatriate sportspeople in Portugal